Nyein Chan Kyaw (born 25 July 1982) is a Burmese actor and writer. He has starred in several Burmese films and direct-to-videos, and best known for his role in the 2016 Burmese drama film The Gemini.

Career
Nyein Chan Kyaw began acting in direct-to-videos, becoming widely noted for his role as Phoe Tar, a retarded boy, in 2015 direct-to-video Phoe Tar. In 2016, he starred his debut film The Gemini, the first LGBT-themed film in cinema of Myanmar, in which he played the role of a homosexual novelist.
 
Nyein Chan Kyaw has since acted in four other feature films, drama series and direct-to-videos. In 2019, he returned to acting with Myint Myat in Black Rose Mission. He won the New York Movie Awards 2020, Best Actor for his role in 2020 film The Naked Ghost.
 
Nyein Chan Kyaw started his writing career in 2016 by his debut film, The Gemini. In 2020, he writes a horror screenplay The Vacant, in which he casts one of the main role, a century aged ghost clingy to the colonial-style manor.

Filmography

References

External links

 

1982 births
Living people
Burmese male film actors
21st-century Burmese male actors
People from Yangon